Leonese may refer to:
Leonese people
Leonese language
Leonese Region
Leonese cuisine

Language and nationality disambiguation pages